Galium odoratum, the sweet woodruff or sweetscented bedstraw, is a flowering perennial plant in the family Rubiaceae, native to much of Europe from Spain and Ireland to Russia, as well as Western Siberia, Turkey, Iran, the Caucasus, China and Japan. It is also sparingly naturalized in scattered locations in the United States and Canada. It is widely cultivated for its flowers and its sweet-smelling foliage.

It owes its sweet smell to the odoriferous agent coumarin, and is sometimes used as a flavouring agent due to its chemical content.

Description

The small (4–7 mm diameter) flowers are produced in cymes, each white with four petals joined together at the base. The fruits are 2–4 mm diameter, produced singly, and each is covered in tiny hooked bristles which help disperse them by sticking temporarily to clothing and animal fur.

This plant prefers partial to full shade in moist, rich soils. In dry summers it needs frequent watering. Propagation is by crown division, separation of the rooted stems, or digging up of the barely submerged perimeter stolons. It is ideal as a groundcover or border accent in woody, acidic gardens where other shade plants fail to thrive. Deer and chickens avoid eating it (Northeast US).

Uses and health risks
As the epithet odoratum suggests, the plant is strongly scented, the sweet scent being derived from coumarin. This scent increases on wilting and then persists on drying, and the dried plant is used in potpourri and as a moth deterrent. It was, and partially is, used to flavour May wine (called "Maibowle" or "Maitrank" in German/French), sweet juice punch, syrup for beer (Berliner Weisse), brandy, jelly, jam, a soft drink (Tarhun, which is Georgian), ice cream, and herbal tea. Also very popular are sweet woodruff flavoured jellies, with and without alcohol. In Germany, it was and to some extent still is also used to flavour sherbet powder, which features prominently in Günter Grass' novel The Tin Drum.

However, industrial usage of the plant for sweets was prohibited in Germany in 1974, due to coumarin, the flavorant found in woodruff, being toxic to rats and mice in studies. It has however not been found to be harmful to humans, even in large doses, in which it follows a different metabolic pathway. The flavour is still popular for sweets in Germany, but is achieved artificially with 6-methyl coumarin. Products targeted towards adults, such as alcoholic drinks, are still permitted to include coumarin, in limited quantities.

References

External links

Plants for a Future
USDA plants profile
Missouri Botanical Gardens Plant Finder

odoratum
Herbs
Medicinal plants of Africa
Medicinal plants of Asia
Medicinal plants of Europe
Flora of France
Flora of Western Asia
Flora of Belgium
Flora of Denmark
Flora of Estonia
Flora of Germany
Flora of Greece
Flora of Italy
Flora of Latvia
Flora of Lithuania
Flora of Norway
Flora of the United Kingdom
Flora of Romania
Flora of Canada
Flora of the United States
Flora of Spain
Flora of Armenia
Flora of Azerbaijan
Flora of Georgia (country)
Flora of Russia
Flora of Siberia
Flora of Iran
Flora of China
Flora of Japan
Groundcovers
Plants described in 1753
Taxa named by Carl Linnaeus